The Rider on the White Horse (German: Der Schimmelreiter) is a 1934 German drama film written and directed by Hans Deppe and Curt Oertel and starring Mathias Wieman, Marianne Hoppe and Ali Ghito.

It was based on the novel of the same name by Theodor Storm. The film's sets were designed by the art director Gabriel Pellon. It was shot on location in Schleswig-Holstein.

Cast
Mathias Wieman as Hauke Haien
Marianne Hoppe as Elke
Ali Ghito as Vollina
Hans Deppe as Knecht Iven
Walther Süssenguth as Ole Peters
Wilhelm Diegelmann as Tede Volkerts
Eduard von Winterstein as Oberdeichgraf
Margarethe Albrecht as Base
Walter Griep as Gypsy
Walter Werner as Iewe Manners

References

External links

German disaster films
German epic films
Films of Nazi Germany
Films directed by Hans Deppe
Flood films
Films based on German novels
Films based on works by Theodor Storm
German black-and-white films
Films set in the 18th century
1930s historical drama films
German historical drama films
1930s German-language films
1930s German films